The Universidad Centroccidental Lisandro Alvarado (UCLA) is a public university of Venezuela located in Barquisimeto. It was founded in 1962 with the creation of the Centro Experimental de Estudios Superiores (CEDES), and became the Universidad de la Región Centro Occidental in 1967, before being given its current name in 1979.

History

Lisandro Alvarado University was established on September 22 of 1962 by Executive Order No. 845, which provided for the establishment of the Experimental Centre for Advanced Studies (CEDES) as core and first stage of the UCLA during the presidency of Rómulo Betancourt. It starts with three professional schools: medicine (1963), agriculture and veterinary medicine (1964). Several years later included the administration.

In 1967, it was given the name of the Midwestern University (UCO) region, Decree No. 89. This article marks the continuity of teaching and administrative activities corresponding to the Experimental Centre for Advanced Studies (CEDES).

By Decree of the President of the Republic N. 55 dated April 2 of 1979, the Executive decided to rename it to the current Centroccidental University Lisandro Alvarado.

Colleges
Business Administration and Accounting
Agronomy
Veterinary Science
Science 
Technology
Humanities and Arts
Civil engineering
Medicine and Nursing

References

External links

Compendium journal

Centro Occidental Lisandro Alvarado, Universidad
Educational institutions established in 1962
Buildings and structures in Barquisimeto
1962 establishments in Venezuela
Buildings and structures in Lara (state)
Carora